Franciscus Xaverius (Frans) Xavery (baptized 15 January 1740, in The Hague – c. 1788), was a Dutch painter, and the son of Jan Baptist Xavery. Frans became a member of the Pictura Society at The Hague in 1768, practised for some time in that city, and later in Amsterdam and Rotterdam. He studied first under his uncle Gerard Joseph, and afterwards under Jacob de Wit.  His brother Jacob was also a painter. His last known dated painting is one in a series on the castle of Turnhout from 1788.

References

1740 births
Year of death missing
18th-century Dutch painters
18th-century Dutch male artists
Artists from The Hague
Dutch landscape painters
Dutch male painters